

Peerage of England

|Earl of Surrey (1088)||John de Warenne, 7th Earl of Surrey||1304||1347||
|-
|rowspan="2"|Earl of Warwick (1088)||Guy de Beauchamp, 10th Earl of Warwick||1298||1315||Died
|-
|Thomas de Beauchamp, 11th Earl of Warwick||1315||1369||
|-
|Earl of Gloucester (1122)||Gilbert de Clare, 8th Earl of Gloucester||1295||1314||Died, title extinct
|-
|Earl of Arundel (1138)||Edmund FitzAlan, 9th Earl of Arundel||1302||1326||
|-
|Earl of Oxford (1142)||Robert de Vere, 6th Earl of Oxford||1297||1331||
|-
|rowspan="2"|Earl of Salisbury (1145)||Margaret de Lacy, 4th Countess of Salisbury||1261||1310||
|-
|Alice de Lacy, 5th Countess of Salisbury||1310||1322||
|-
|Earl of Hereford (1199)||Humphrey de Bohun, 4th Earl of Hereford||1298||1322||
|-
|rowspan="2"|Earl of Lincoln (1217)||Henry de Lacy, 3rd Earl of Lincoln||1266||1311||Died
|-
|Alice de Lacy, 4th Countess of Lincoln||1311||1348||
|-
|Earl of Pembroke (1247)||Aymer de Valence, 2nd Earl of Pembroke||1296||1324||
|-
|Earl of Leicester (1265)||Thomas Plantagenet, 2nd Earl of Leicester and Lancaster||1296||1322||
|-
|Earl of Richmond (1306)||John of Brittany, Earl of Richmond||1306||1334||
|-
|Earl of Cornwall (1307)||Piers Gaveston, 1st Earl of Cornwall||1307||1312||Died, title extinct
|-
|Earl of Norfolk (1312)||Thomas of Brotherton, 1st Earl of Norfolk||1312||1338||New creation
|-
|rowspan="2"|Baron de Ros (1264)||William de Ros, 1st Baron de Ros||1285||1316||Died
|-
|William de Ros, 2nd Baron de Ros||1216||1342||
|-
|Baron le Despencer (1264)||Hugh le Despencer, 2nd Baron le Despencer||1265||1326||
|-
|Baron Basset of Drayton (1264)||Ralph Basset, 2nd Baron Basset of Drayton||1299||1343||
|-
|Baron Basset of Sapcote (1264)||Ralph Basset, 3rd baron Basset of Sapcote||1300||1326||Never summoned to Parliament
|-
|Baron Mowbray (1283)||John de Mowbray, 2nd Baron Mowbray||1297||1322||
|-
|rowspan="2"|Baron Hastings (1290)||John Hastings, 1st Baron Hastings||1290||1313||Died
|- 
|John Hastings, 2nd Baron Hastings||1313||1325||
|- 
|rowspan="2"|Baron Astley (1295)||Nicholas de Astley, 2nd Baron Astley||1301||1314||Died
|- 
|Thomas de Astley, 3rd Baron Astley||1314||1359||
|- 
|Baron Berkeley (1295)||Thomas de Berkeley, 1st Baron Berkeley||1295||1321||
|- 
|Baron Boteler (1295)||William le Boteler, 1st Baron Boteler||1295||1328||
|- 
|Baron Canville (1295)||William de Canville, 2nd Baron Canville||1308||1338||
|- 
|rowspan="2"|Baron Clavering (1295)||Robert FitzRoger, 1st Baron Clavering||1295||1310||Died
|- 
|John de Clavering, 2nd Baron Clavering||1310||1332||
|- 
|Baron Corbet (1295)||Piers Corbet, 2nd Baron Corbet||1300||1322||
|- 
|rowspan="2"|Baron Fauconberg (1295)||Walter de Fauconberg, 2nd Baron Fauconberg||1304||1318||Died
|- 
|John de Fauconberg, 3rd Baron Fauconberg||1318||1349||
|- 
|Baron FitzWalter (1295)||Robert FitzWalter, 1st Baron FitzWalter||1295||1325||
|- 
|rowspan="2"|Baron FitzWarine (1295)||Fulke FitzWarine, 1st Baron FitzWarine||1295||1315||Died
|- 
|Fulke FitzWarine, 2nd Baron FitzWarine||1315||1349||
|- 
|rowspan="3"|Baron FitzWilliam (1295)||Ralph FitzWilliam, 1st Baron FitzWilliam||1295||1315||Died
|- 
|Robert FitzWilliam, 2nd Baron FitzWilliam||1315||1317||
|- 
|Ralph FitzWilliam, 3rd Baron FitzWilliam||1317||1321||
|- 
|Baron Giffard (1295)||John Giffard, 2nd Baron Giffard||1299||1322||
|- 
|Baron Grey de Wilton (1295)||John Grey, 2nd Baron Grey de Wilton||1308||1323||
|-
|Baron Huntercombe (1295)||Walter de Huntercombe, 1st Baron Huntercombe||1295||1312||Died, title extinct
|- 
|Baron Hussee (1295)||Henry Hussee, 1st Baron Hussee||1295||1332||
|- 
|Baron Hylton (1295)||Robert Hylton, 1st Baron Hylton||1295||1322||
|- 
|Baron Knovill (1295)||Bogo de Knovill, 2nd Baron Knovill||1306||1338||
|- 
|Baron Kyme (1295)||Philip de Kyme, 1st Baron Kyme||1295||1323||
|-
|Baron Martin (1295)||William Martin, 1st Baron Martin||1295||1325||
|- 
|rowspan="2"|Baron Mauley (1295)||Peter de Mauley, 1st Baron Mauley||1295||1310||Died
|- 
|Peter de Mauley, 2nd Baron Mauley||1310||1355||
|- 
|Baron Meinill (1295)||Nicholas Meinill, 2nd Baron Meinill||1299||1322||
|- 
|rowspan="2"|Baron Montfort (1295)||John de Montfort, 2nd Baron Montfort||1296||1314||Died
|- 
|John de Montfort, 3rd Baron Montfort||1314||1367||
|- 
|Baron Mortimer of Wigmore (1295)||Roger de Mortimer, 2nd Baron Mortimer de Wigmore||1304||1330||
|- 
|Baron Neville de Raby (1295)||Ralph Neville, 1st Baron Neville de Raby||1295||1331||
|- 
|Baron Plugenet (1295)||Alan de Plugenet, 2nd Baron Plugenet||1299||1326||
|- 
|rowspan="2"|Baron Poyntz (1295)||Nicholas Poyntz, 2nd Baron Poyntz||1308||1311||Died
|- 
|Hugh Poyntz, 3rd Baron Poyntz||1311||1333||
|- 
|Baron Segrave (1295)||John de Segrave, 2nd Baron Segrave||1295||1325||
|- 
|Baron Segrave of Barton Segrave (1295)||Nicholas de Segrave, 1st Baron Segrave of Barton Segrave||1295||1322||
|- 
|Baron Strange (1295)||Roger Le Strange, 1st Baron Strange||1295||1311||Died, Barony became dormant
|- 
|Baron Umfraville (1295)||Robert de Umfraville, 2nd Baron Umfraville||1307||1325||
|- 
|Baron Verdun (1295)||Theobald de Verdun, 2nd Baron Verdun||1309||1316||Died, Barony fell into abeyance
|- 
|Baron Wake (1295)||John Wake, 1st Baron Wake||1300||1349||
|- 
|Baron Ap-Adam (1299)||John Ap-Adam, 1st Baron Ap-Adam||1299||1311||Died; none of his heirs were summoned to Parliament in respect of this Barony
|- 
|Baron Bardolf (1299)||Thomas Bardolf, 2nd Baron Bardolf||1304||1328||
|- 
|Baron Basset of Weldon (1299)||Richard Basset, 1st Baron Basset of Weldon||1299||1314||Died; none of his heirs were summoned to Parliament in respect of this Barony
|- 
|Baron Braose (1299)||William de Braose, 2nd Baron Braose||1299||1326||Died, Barony fell into abeyance
|- 
|Baron Chaurces (1299)||Thomas de Chaurces, 1st Baron Chaurces||1299||1315||Died; none of his heirs were summoned to Parliament in respect of this Barony
|- 
|rowspan="2"|Baron Clinton (1299)||John de Clinton, 1st Baron Clinton||1299||1310||Died
|- 
|John de Clinton, 2nd Baron Clinton||1310||1335||
|- 
|Baron de la Mare (1299)||John De La Mare, 1st Baron de la Mare||1299||1316||Died, title extinct
|- 
|Baron De La Warr (1299)||Roger la Warr, 1st Baron De La Warr||1299||1320||
|- 
|Baron Deincourt (1299)||Edmund Deincourt, 1st Baron Deincourt||1299||1327||
|- 
|Baron Devereux (1299)||William Devereux, 1st Baron Devereux||1299||1330?||
|- 
|Baron Engaine (1299)||John Engaine, 1st Baron Engaine||1299||1322||
|- 
|rowspan="2"|Baron Ferrers of Chartley (1299)||John de Ferrers, 1st Baron Ferrers of Chartley||1299||1312||Died
|- 
|John de Ferrers, 2nd Baron Ferrers of Chartley||1312||c1324||
|- 
|rowspan="2"|Baron FitzPayne (1299)||Robert FitzPayne, 1st Baron FitzPayne||1299||1316||Died
|- 
|Robert FitzPayne, 2nd Baron FitzPayne||1316||1354||
|- 
|Baron Grandison (1299)||William de Grandison, 1st Baron Grandison||1299||1335||
|- 
|Baron Havering (1299)||John de Havering, 1st Baron Havering||1299||1329||
|- 
|Baron Lancaster (1299)||Henry Plantagenet, 1st Baron Lancaster||1299||1345||
|- 
|Baron Leyburn (1299)||William de Leyburn, 1st Baron Leyburn||1299||1310||Died; none of his heirs were summoned to Parliament in respect of this Barony
|- 
|rowspan="3"|Baron Lovel (1299)||John Lovel, 1st Baron Lovel||1299||1311||Died
|- 
|John Lovel, 2nd Baron Lovel||1311||1314||
|- 
|John Lovel, 3rd Baron Lovel||1314||1347||
|- 
|Baron Moels (1299)||Nicholas de Moels, 2nd Baron Moels||1309||1315||Died; none of his heirs were summoned to Parliament in respect of this Barony
|- 
|Baron Mohun (1299)||John de Mohun, 1st Baron Mohun||1299||1330||
|- 
|Baron Mortimer of Chirke (1299)||Roger de Mortimer, 1st Baron Mortimer of Chirke||1299||1336||
|- 
|Baron Multon of Egremont (1299)||Thomas de Multon, 1st Baron Multon of Egremont||1299||1322||
|- 
|rowspan="2"|Baron Percy (1299)||Henry de Percy, 1st Baron Percy||1299||1315||Died
|- 
|Henry de Percy, 2nd Baron Percy||1315||1352||
|- 
|Baron Peyvre (1299)||Johny Peyvre, 1st Baron Peyvre||1299||1316||Died; Barony probably terminated
|- 
|rowspan="2"|Baron Rivers of Ongar (1299)||John Rivers, 1st Baron Rivers||1299||1311||Died
|- 
|John Rivers, 2nd Baron Rivers||1311||1350||
|- 
|Baron Saint Amand (1299)||Almaric de St Amand, 1st Baron Saint Amand||1299||1310||Died, Barony extinct
|- 
|Baron Scales (1299)||Robert de Scales, 2nd Baron Scales||1305||1324||
|- 
|Baron Stafford (1299)||Ralph de Stafford, 2nd Baron Stafford||1309||1372||
|- 
|Baron Tregoz (1299)||Henry de Tregoz, 2nd Baron Tregoz||1305||1322||
|- 
|Baron Teyes (1299)||Henry de Teyes, 2nd Baron Teyes||1308||1321||
|- 
|Baron Valence (1299)||Aymer de Valence, 1st Baron Valence||1299||1323||
|- 
|rowspan="2"|Baron Vavasour (1299)||William de Vavasour, 1st Baron Vavasour||1299||1313||Died
|- 
|Walter de Vavasour, 2nd Baron Vavasour||1313||1325||
|- 
|Baron Vere (1299)||Hugh de Vere, 1st Baron Vere||1299||1318||Died, Barony extinct
|- 
|rowspan="2"|Baron Welles (1299)||Adam de Welles, 1st Baron Welles||1299||1311||Died
|- 
|Robert de Welles, 2nd Baron Welles||1311||1320||
|- 
|Baron Zouche (1299)||Alan La Zouche, 1st Baron Zouche||1299||1314||Died, Barony fell into abeyance
|- 
|Baron Toni (1299)||Robert de Toni, 1st Baron Toni||1299||1310||Died, Barony extinct
|- 
|Baron Beauchamp of Somerset (1299)||John de Beauchamp, 1st Baron Beauchamp||1299||1336||
|- 
|Baron Cauntelo (1299)||William de Cauntelo, 2nd Baron Cauntelo||1308||1321||
|- 
|rowspan="2"|Baron de Clifford (1299)||Robert de Clifford, 1st Baron de Clifford||1299||1314||Died
|- 
|Roger de Clifford, 2nd Baron de Clifford||1314||1322||
|- 
|Baron Darcy (1299)||Philip Darcy, Baron Darcy||1299||1332||
|- 
|Baron De La Ward (1299)||Simon de La Ward, 2nd Baron De La Ward||1307||1324||
|- 
|Baron Ferrers of Groby (1299)||William Ferrers, 1st Baron Ferrers of Groby||1299||1325||
|- 
|Baron FitzReginald (1299)||John FitzReginald, 1st Baron FitzReginald||1299||1310||Died; none of his heirs were summoned to Parliament in respect of this Barony
|- 
|Baron Furnivall (1299)||Thomas de Furnivall, 1st Baron Furnivall||1299||1332||
|- 
|Baron Grendon (1299)||Ralph Grendon, 1st Baron Grendon||1299||1331||
|- 
|Baron Hastings of Inchmahome (1299)||Edmund Hastings, 1st Baron Hastings of Inchmahome||1299||1314||Died, title extinct
|- 
|Baron Lancaster (1299)||John de Lancastre, 1st Baron Lancaster||1299||1334||
|- 
|Baron Latimer (1299)||Thomas Latimer, 1st Baron Latimer||1299||1334||
|- 
|Baron Latimer (1299)||William Latimer, 2nd Baron Latimer||1305||1327||
|- 
|Baron Lisle (1299)|| John de Lisle, 2nd Baron Lisle ||1304||1337||
|- 
|rowspan="3"|Baron Montagu (1299)||Simon de Montacute, 1st Baron Montagu||1299||1316||Died
|- 
|William de Montacute, 2nd Baron Montagu||1316||1319||Died
|- 
|William de Montacute, 3rd Baron Montagu||1319||1344||
|- 
|rowspan="2"|Baron Morley (1299)||William de Morley||1299||1310||Died
|- 
|Robert de Morley, 2nd Baron Morley||1310||1360||
|- 
|Baron Paynel (1299)||John Paynel, 1st Baron Paynel||1299||1318||Died
|- 
|Baron Pecche (1299)||Gilbert Peche||1299||1322||
|- 
|Baron Rithre (1299)||William de Rithre, 1st Baron Rithre||1299||1310||Died; none of his heirs were summoned to Parliament in respect of this Barony
|- 
|Baron Roche (1299)||Thomas de la Roche, 1st Baron Roche||1299||1320||
|- 
|Baron Saint John of Basing (1299)||John St John, 1st Baron Saint John of Basing||1299||1329||
|- 
|rowspan="2"|Baron Saint John of Lageham (1299)||John St John, 1st Baron Saint John of Lageham||1299||1317||Died
|- 
|John St John, 2nd Baron Saint John of Lageham||1317||1323||
|- 
|rowspan="2"|Baron Strange of Knockyn (1299)||John le Strange, 2nd Baron Strange of Knockyn||1309||1311||Died
|- 
|John le Strange, 3rd Baron Strange of Knockyn||1311||1324||
|- 
|Baron Sudeley (1299)||John de Sudeley, 1st Baron Sudeley||1299||1336||
|- 
|Baron Balliol (1300)||Alexander de Balliol, 1st Baron Balliol||1300||c. 1311||Attainted and his honours became forfeited
|- 
|Baron Paynel (1303)||William Paynel, 1st Baron Paynel||1303||1317||Died, Barony became extinct
|- 
|Baron Botetourt (1305)||John de Botetourt, 1st Baron Botetourt||1305||1324||
|- 
|rowspan="2"|Baron Multon of Gilsland (1307)||Thomas de Multon, 1st Baron Multon of Gilsland||1307||1313||Died
|- 
|John de Multon, 2nd Baron Multon of Gilsland||1313||1334||
|- 
|Baron Thweng (1307)||Marmaduke de Thweng, 1st Baron Thweng||1307||1323||
|- 
|Baron Boteler of Wemme (1308)||William Le Boteler, 1st Baron Boteler of Wemme||1308||1334||
|- 
|Baron Cromwell (1308)||John de Cromwell, 1st Baron Cromwell||1308||1335||
|- 
|Baron Grelle (1308)||Thomas de Grelle, 1st Baron Grelle||1308||1347||
|- 
|Baron Somery (1308)||John de Somery, 1st Baron Somery||1308||1321||
|- 
|Baron Zouche of Haryngworth (1308)||William la Zouche, 1st Baron Zouche||1308||1352||
|- 
|Baron Marshal (1309)||William Marshal, 1st Baron Marshal||1309||1314||Died; none of his heirs were summoned to Parliament in respect of this Barony
|- 
|rowspan="2"|Baron Ufford (1309)||Robert de Ufford, 1st Baron Ufford||1309||1316||Died
|- 
|Robert de Ufford, 2nd Baron Ufford||1316||1369||
|- 
|Baron Beaumont (1309)||Henry Beaumont, 1st Baron Beaumont||1309||1340||
|- 
|Baron Cailly (1309)||Thomas de Cailly, 1st Baron Cailly||1309||1317||Died, Barony became extinct
|- 
|Baron Everingham (1309)||Adam Everingham, 1st Baron Everingham||1309||1341||
|- 
|Baron FitzHenry (1309)||Aucher FitzHenry, 1st Baron FitzHenry||1309||1339||
|- 
|Baron Gorges (1309)||Ralph de Gorges, 1st Baron Gorges||1309||1324||
|- 
|Baron Monthermer (1309)||Ralph de Monthermer, 1st Baron Monthermer||1309||1325||
|- 
|Baron Orreby (1309)||John de Orreby, 1st Baron Orreby||1309||1318||Died; none of his heirs were summoned to Parliament in respect of this Barony
|- 
|Baron Strange of Blackmere (1309)||Fulk le Strange, 1st Baron Strange of Blackmere||1309||1324||
|- 
|Baron Thorpe (1309)||John de Thorpe, 1st Baron Thorpe||1309||1325||
|- 
|Baron Badlesmere (1309)||Bartholomew de Badlesmere, 1st Baron Badlesmere||1309||1322||
|- 
|Baron Clare (1309)||Richard de Clare, 1st Baron Clare||1309||1318||Died, Barony became extinct
|- 
|Baron Burnell (1311)||Edward Burnell, 1st Baron Burnell||1311||1315||New creation, died, Barony became extinct
|- 
|Baron Echingham (1311)||William de Echingham, 1st Baron Echingham||1311||1326||New creation
|- 
|Baron Hastang (1311)||Robert Hastang, 1st Baron Hastang||1311||c. 1320||New creation; died, none of his heirs were summoned to Parliament in respect of this Barony
|- 
|Baron Lisle (1311)||Robert de Lisle, 1st Baron Lisle||1311||1343||New creation
|- 
|Baron Nevill (1311)||Hugh de Nevill, 1st Baron Nevill||1311||1336||New creation
|- 
|rowspan="2"|Baron Audley of Heleigh (1313)||Nicholas de Audley, 1st Baron Audley of Heleigh||1313||1316||New creation, died
|- 
|James de Audley, 2nd Baron Audley of Heleigh||1316||1386||
|- 
|Baron Bavent (1313)||Roger Bavent, 1st Baron Bavent||1313||1335||New creation
|- 
|Baron Brun (1313)||Maurice le Brun, 1st Baron Brun||1313||1355||New creation
|- 
|Baron Cobham of Kent (1313)||Henry de Cobham, 1st Baron Cobham of Kent||1313||1339||New creation
|- 
|Baron Felton (1313)||Robert de Felton, 1st Baron Felton||1313||1314||New creation; died, none of his heirs were summoned to Parliament in respect of this Barony
|- 
|Baron FitzBernard (1313)||Thomas Fitzbernard, 1st Baron Fitzbernard||1313||Bef. 1334||New creation
|- 
|rowspan="2"|Baron Northwode (1313)||John de Northwode, 1st Baron Northwode||1313||1319||New creation, died
|- 
|Roger de Northwode, 2nd Baron Northwode||1319||1361||
|- 
|Baron Stapleton (1313)||Miles Stapleton, 1st Baron Stapleton||1313||1314||New creation; died, none of his heirs were summoned to Parliament in respect of this Barony
|- 
|Baron Vesci (1313)||William de Vesci, 1st Baron Vesci||1313||1314||New creation; died, Barony became extinct
|- 
|Baron Saint Amand (1313)||John de St Amand, 1st Baron Saint Amand||1313||1330||New creation
|- 
|Baron Cherleton (1313)||John Cherleton, 1st Baron Cherleton||1313||1353||New creation
|- 
|Baron Marmion (1313)||John Marmion, 1st Baron Marmion||1313||1323||New creation
|- 
|Baron Say (1313)||Geoffrey de Say, 1st Baron Say||1313||1322||New creation
|- 
|rowspan="2"|Baron Willoughby de Eresby (1313)||Robert de Willoughby, 1st Baron Willoughby de Eresby||1313||1317||New creation; died
|- 
|John de Willoughby, 2nd Baron Willoughby de Eresby||1317||1349||
|- 
|Baron Saint Maur (1313)||Nicholas St Maur, 1st Baron Saint Maur||1313||1317||New creation; died, none of his heirs were summoned to Parliament in respect of this Barony
|- 
|Baron Camoys (1313)||Ralph de Camoys, 1st Baron Camoys||1313||1335||New creation
|- 
|Baron Columbers (1314)||Philip de Columbers, 1st Baron Columbers||1314||1342||New creation
|- 
|Baron le Despencer (1314)||Hugh Despencer, 1st Lord Despencer||1314||1326||New creation
|- 
|Baron Holand (1314)||Robert de Holland, 1st Baron Holand||1314||1328||New creation
|- 
|Baron Audley (1317)||Hugh de Audley, 1st Baron Audley||1317||1347||New creation
|- 
|Baron D'Amorie (1317)||Roger D'Amorie, 1st Baron D'Amorie||1317||1322||New creation
|- 
|Baron Plaiz (1317)||Richard de Playz, 1st Baron Playz||1317||1327||New creation
|- 
|Baron Saint Maur (1317)||William de St Maur, 1st Baron Saint Maru||1317||1322||New creation
|- 
|}

Peerage of Scotland

|Earl of Mar (1114)||Domhnall II, Earl of Mar||1305||1332||
|-
|Earl of Dunbar (1115)||Patrick V, Earl of March||1308||1368||
|-
|Earl of Angus (1115)||Robert de Umfraville, Earl of Angus||1307||1314||Title forfeited
|-
|Earl of Atholl (1115)||David II Strathbogie, Earl of Atholl||1307||1314||Title forfeited
|-
|rowspan=2|Earl of Strathearn (1115)||Maol Íosa III, Earl of Strathearn||1271||1317||Died
|-
|Maol Íosa IV, Earl of Strathearn||1317||1329||
|-
|Earl of Fife (1129)||Donnchadh IV, Earl of Fife||1288||1353||
|-
|Earl of Menteith (1160)||Muireadhach III, Earl of Menteith||1308||1333||
|-
|Earl of Lennox (1184)||Maol Choluim II, Earl of Lennox||1291||1333||
|-
|Earl of Ross (1215)||Uilleam II, Earl of Ross||1274||1333||
|-
|Earl of Sutherland (1235)||William de Moravia, 3rd Earl of Sutherland||1307||1325||
|-
|Earl of Moray (1312)||Thomas Randolph, 1st Earl of Moray||1312||1332||New creation
|-
|Earl of Carrick (1314)||Edward Bruce, Earl of Carrick||1312||1318||New creation; died, and the Earldom reverted to the Crown
|-
|}

Peerage of Ireland

|Earl of Ulster (1264)||Richard Óg de Burgh, 2nd Earl of Ulster||1271||1326||
|-
|rowspan=2|Earl of Kildare (1316)||John FitzGerald, 1st Earl of Kildare||1316||1316||New creation; died
|-
|Thomas FitzGerald, 2nd Earl of Kildare||1316||1328||
|-
|Earl of Louth (1319)||John de Bermingham, 1st Earl of Louth||1319||1329||New creation
|-
|Baron Athenry (1172)||Rickard de Bermingham||1307||1322||
|-
|Baron Kingsale (1223)||Miles de Courcy, 6th Baron Kingsale||1303||1338||
|-
|Baron Kerry (1223)||Nicholas Fitzmaurice, 3rd Baron Kerry||1303||1324||
|-
|Baron Barry (1261)||John Barry, 4th Baron Barry||1290||1330||
|-
|}

References

 

Lists of peers by decade
1310s in England
1310s in Ireland
14th century in Scotland
14th-century English people
14th-century Irish people
14th-century Scottish earls
1310 in Europe
14th century in England
14th century in Ireland
Peers